Cesar Rivera Samaniego (born August 25, 1986 in Pomona, California) is an American retired soccer player.

Career

College and amateur
Rivera played college soccer at Mt. San Antonio College in Walnut, California, where he was a junior college Second Team All-American.

After spending time training with Mexican clubs Necaxa and Morelia, and playing with numerous Los Angeles-area amateur teams, Rivera played with the Los Angeles Azul Legends in the USL Premier Development League in 2010.

Professional
Rivera turned professional when he signed with the expansion Los Angeles Blues of the new USL Professional League in February 2011. He made his professional debut – and scored his first professional goal – on April 15, 2011 in a 3–0 victory over Sevilla Puerto Rico

He was released by the LA Blues following the conclusion of the 2011 USL Pro season, and subsequently signed to play for the Los Angeles Misioneros in the USL Premier Development League in 2012. He scored his first goal for his new club on his debut, a 4-1 opening-day loss to Fresno Fuego.

References

1986 births
Living people
American soccer players
LA Laguna FC players
Orange County SC players
Cal FC players
USL League Two players
USL Championship players
Association football midfielders